Vice-Admiral George Henry Seymour,  (20 March 1818 – 25 July 1869) was a Royal Navy officer who served as Third Naval Lord from 1866 to 1868.

Career
Seymour was the son of Admiral Sir George Seymour and grandson of Lord Hugh Seymour. His mother was Georgiana Mary, daughter of Admiral the Hon. Sir George Cranfield Berkeley. Francis Seymour, 5th Marquess of Hertford, was his elder brother. He went on to command  and then  in the Baltic Sea during the Crimean War. He also commanded ,  and then HMY Victoria and Albert.

Promoted to rear admiral in 1863, Seymour served as a Third Naval Lord between 1866 and 1868. He also sat as Conservative Member of Parliament for Antrim from 1865 to 1869 and in Parliament he advocated road improvements outside the Victoria and Albert Museum.

Family
Seymour married Sophia Margaret, daughter of Derick Hoste, in 1861. They had two sons and three daughters. His daughter Alexandra married Sir Ian Heathcoat-Amory, 2nd Baronet, and was the mother of Derick Heathcoat-Amory, 1st Viscount Amory. Seymour died in July 1869, aged 51. Sophia Margaret remained a widow until her death in May 1917.

References

External links
 
 
 

|-

1818 births
1869 deaths
Companions of the Order of the Bath
Henry Seymour
Members of the Parliament of the United Kingdom for County Antrim constituencies (1801–1922)
UK MPs 1865–1868
UK MPs 1868–1874
Irish Conservative Party MPs
Royal Navy officers
Royal Navy personnel of the Crimean War
Lords of the Admiralty